The 2012 Canad Inns Prairie Classic was held from October 19 to 22 at the Portage Curling Club in Portage la Prairie, Manitoba as part of the 2012–13 World Curling Tour. The event was held in a triple knockout format, and the purse for the event was CAD $58,000, of which the winner, Kevin Koe, received CAD$18,000. Koe defeated Alberta rival Kevin Martin in the final with a score of 9–4.

Teams

The teams are listed as follows:

Knockout results
The draw is listed as follows:

A event

B event

C event

Playoffs

References

External links

2012 in Manitoba
Sport in Portage la Prairie
2012 in Canadian curling
Curling in Manitoba